Hydroperoxide lyases are enzymes that catalyze the cleavage of C-C bonds in the hydroperoxides of fatty acids. They belong to the cytochrome P450 enzyme family (CYP74C and CYP74B).

Polyunsaturated fatty acids such as linolenic and linoleic acids are susceptible to formation of hydroperoxides upon contact with oxygen in air.  Hydroperoxides are highly reactive functional groups since they contain an oxidant (O-O bond) adjacent to a reductant (C-H bonds).  When flanked by olefins, the hydroperoxides can be induced to rearrange to give the hemiacetal.  It is this reaction that is catalyzed by hydroperoxide lyases.  The resulting aldehydes are notable as fragrances, green leaf volatiles, and antifeedants.

References

Further reading 

 
 

Lyases